Ernest Arnfield (25 December 1853 – 8 August 1945) was an English football manager who was secretary/manager of Southampton F.C. from 1897 to 1911, and again from 1912 to 1919.

Arnfield was born in Mellor, Derbyshire. He died in Southampton, aged 91.

Honours
Southampton
Southern League champions: 1897–98, 1898–99, 1900–01, 1902–03 and 1903–04
FA Cup finalists: 1900 and 1902

References

Southampton F.C. managers
1853 births
1945 deaths
Southern Football League managers
People from Mellor, Greater Manchester
Sportspeople from Derbyshire